Bremerhaven was a German fishing trawler that was built in 1929 as Ernst Kühling. She was renamed Bremerhaven in 1937. She was requisitoned by the Kriegsmarine during the Second World War for use as a vorpostenboot, serving as V 412 Bremerhaven. She was torpedoed and sunk in November 1941.

Description
The engine was built by the Ottensener Maschinenbau GmbH, Altona, Germany. It was rated at 86nhp.

History
Ernst Kühling was built as yard number 270 by the Schiffswerft von Henry Koch, AG, Lübeck, Germany for the Hochseefischerei Julius Weeting AG, Bremerhaven, Germany. She was launched in August 1927 and completed on 24 September. The fishing boat registration BX 193 was allocated, as were the Code Letters OVLS. On 16 June 1930, her registration was changed to ON 128, then to PG 468 on 4 September 1934. On 10 November, she was placed under the management the Nordsee Deutsche Hochsee Fisherei Bremen-Cuxhaven AG. In 1934, her code letters were changed to DNOK. 

Ernst Kühling was renamed Bremerhaven in 1937. She was requisitioned by the Kriegsmarine on 23 November 1939 for use as a vorpostenboot. She was allocated to 4 Vorpostenflotille as V 412 Bremerhaven. She was torpedoed and sunk west of Saint-Pol-sur-Mer, Nord, France by the Royal Navy Motor Torpedo Boat HMMTB 45 on 25 November 1941.

References

Sources

1927 ships
Ships built in Lübeck
Fishing vessels of Germany
Steamships of Germany
World War II merchant ships of Germany
Auxiliary ships of the Kriegsmarine
Maritime incidents in November 1941
World War II shipwrecks in the English Channel